Elections to Calderdale Metropolitan Borough Council were held on 4 May 2006. One third of the council was up for election and the council stayed under no overall control with a minority Conservative administration.

17 of the 51 seats were up for re-election. Although these are the results after the election, the number of seats per party changed later that year. Councillor Paul Rogan was returned by the Rastrick ward in this election for four years as a Conservative councillor and is included in the twenty Conservative seats shown below. However, after the 2006 election, he left the party and joined the English Democrats Party. Also this year, Councillor Nicholas Yates, who had been returned by the Brighouse ward in the 2004 election for four years and is included in the twenty Conservative seats shown below, left the party to continue his tenure as an Independent. This left the Conservatives with 18 seats, 1 held by the English Democrats and 4 held by Independents. In December 2006, Illingworth and Mixenden ward Councillor Tom McElroy (Labour) died suddenly, leaving Labour with nine seats. The by-election to succeed him took place on 22 February 2007, with Labour holding the ward.

Council results
Percentage change calculated compared to the previous election's results

Council composition
Prior to the election the composition of the council was:

After the election the composition of the council was:

Ward results
Percentage change calculated compared to the last time these candidates stood for election.

Brighouse ward 

The incumbent was Colin Stout as an Independent.

Calder ward 

The incumbent was Nader Fekri for the Liberal Democrats.

Elland ward 

The incumbent was Michael Clarke for the Conservative Party.

Greetland and Stainland ward 

The incumbent was Elizabeth Ingleton for the Liberal Democrats.

Hipperholme and Lightcliffe ward 

The incumbent was John Foran for the Conservative Party.

Illingworth and Mixenden ward 

The incumbent was Geoffrey Wallace for the BNP.

Luddendenfoot ward 

The incumbent was Peter Coles for the Liberal Democrats.

Northowram and Shelf ward 

The incumbent was Stephen Baines for the Conservative Party.

Ovenden ward 

The incumbents were Helen Rivron and Linda Riordan for the Labour Party.

Park ward 

The incumbent was Zafar Iqbal Din for the Labour Party.

Rastrick ward 

The incumbent was Paul Rogan for the Conservative Party.

Ryburn ward 

The incumbent was Kay Barret for the Conservative Party.

Skircoat ward 

The incumbent was Grenville Horsfall for the Conservative Party.

Sowerby Bridge ward 

The incumbent was Robert Reynolds for the Conservative Party.

Todmorden ward 

The incumbent was Ruth Goldthorpe for the Liberal Democrats.

Town ward 

The incumbent was Adrian Marsden for the BNP.

Warley ward 

The incumbent was Jennifer Carr as an Independent.

By-elections between 2006 and 2007

Illingworth and Mixenden ward, 2007

References

2006
2006 English local elections
2000s in West Yorkshire